, stylized as SUZAKINISHI THE ANIMATION or SuzakiNishi the Animation is a Japanese anime television series produced by Feel. The anime is based on Bunka Housou Chou A&G + internet radio program SuzakiNishi by Aya Suzaki and Asuka Nishi. Besides starring in the anime, both voice actresses also perform the anime theme song "Smile☆Revolution".

Plot
Two transfer students arrive at a certain high school in Tokyo at the same time on the same day; airhead Aya Suzaki and happy-go-lucky Asuka Nishi. The story is about the two girls everyday fun school life.

Characters

References

External links
 

2015 anime television series debuts
Feel (animation studio)
Tokyo MX original programming